Karsal is a village and union council, an administrative subdivision, of Chakwal District in the Punjab Province of Pakistan. It is part of Chakwal Tehsil. Famous Sufi Bari Imam was born in this area. Members of the Kassar tribe make up the bulk of the population. It is one of a cluster of villages such as Chawli, Bhagwal, Dhoke Walana, Dhoke Kassar and Dhoke Chakoi which form the tribal homeland of the Kassar. The Kassar tribe is also belong to Karlal Sardar tribe which is founded by Abottabad Hazara . Bal Khan father name was Kral sha / Kallar sha . Bal khan has 3 other Brothers (1) Mal Khan (2) Jiya Khan (3) Tughlu khan .

References

Union councils of Chakwal District
Populated places in Chakwal District